Deep Heat is the third studio album by Australian indie rock band Oh Mercy. The album was released in August 2012 and peaked at number 21 on the ARIA Charts.

At the J Awards of 2012, the album was nominated for the Australian Album of the Year.

At the ARIA Music Awards of 2012, the album was nominated for the ARIA Award for Best Rock Album and ARIA Award for Best Cover Art.

Track listing 
 "Deep Heat" - 3:38
 "Rebel Beats" - 3:32
 "My Man" - 4:04
 "Fever" - 3:54
 "Pilgrim's Blues" - 3:23
 "Europa" - 2:54
 "Suffocated" - 2:48
 "Still Making Me Pay" - 4:09
 "Drums" - 3:03
 "Labour of Love" - 3:10

Chart

References 

2012 albums
Oh Mercy (band) albums